Michelle Konkoly (born February 20, 1992) is a Paralympic swimmer from Pennsylvania who trains in Naples, Florida. She earned four medals including two gold medals at the 2016 Summer Paralympics and three silver medals at the 2015 IPC Swimming World Championships.

Injury
In January 2011, Konkoly had a serious spinal cord injury after she tried to open a window and accidentally fell out of a five-storey dorm window and landed onto a sidewalk below when she attended Georgetown University. She shattered her L2 vertebrae, broke some of her ribs and her right foot and damaged her spinal cord and had very limited movement below her waist. She had three major surgeries and six months of rehab and she relearned to walk however she has permanent weakness in her legs.

References 

Living people
1992 births
Medalists at the 2016 Summer Paralympics
Paralympic gold medalists for the United States
Paralympic silver medalists for the United States
Paralympic bronze medalists for the United States
Sportspeople from Naples, Florida
American female freestyle swimmers
Swimmers from Pennsylvania
Georgetown University alumni
American people of Hungarian descent
Paralympic medalists in swimming
Swimmers at the 2016 Summer Paralympics
Paralympic swimmers of the United States
21st-century American women
S10-classified Paralympic swimmers
Medalists at the World Para Swimming Championships